The Lavochkin La-11 (NATO reporting name Fang) was an early post-World War II Soviet long-range piston-engined fighter aircraft. The design was essentially that of a Lavochkin La-9 with additional fuel tanks and the deletion of one of the four 23 mm Nudelman-Suranov NS-23 cannons. Like the La-9, the La-11 was designed to be a low to medium-altitude general-purpose fighter, although the additional fuel tanks were added with the intent of employing the La-11 in the escort fighter role.

In reality, the La-11 would go on to serve almost exclusively as an interceptor, with the majority of its engagements during the Korean War seeing it pitted against bomber and transport aircraft. While an improvement over earlier aircraft, the La-9 and La-11 retained the poor high-altitude performance that was common among many Soviet piston-engined airframes, with the La-11 enjoying only a 20 km/h (12 mph) advantage over the Boeing B-29 Superfortress at the latter’s cruising altitude. This relatively poor high-altitude performance combined with the arrival of the jet engine led swiftly to the La-11s (and La-9s) in most frontline Soviet Air Force (VVS) units being replaced with early Soviet jets such as the Mikoyan-Gurevich MiG-15. While quickly ousted from service with the VVS, the La-9 and 11 would both see service well into the 1950s and 1960s with the Chinese People’s Liberation Army Air Force and the North Korean People’s Army Air and Anti-Air Force, with the last La-11s being retired from the former in 1966.

Development
One of the recommendations from the government testing of Lavochkin La-130 (Lavochkin La-9 prototype) was to further develop it into a long-range escort fighter. The resultant La-134 prototype (also sometimes referred to as La-9M) featured increased fuel and oil capacity. Armament was reduced to three cannons. The prototype flew in May 1947. The second prototype, La-134D had fuel capacity increased by an additional 275 L (73 US gal) with wing and external fuel tanks. The aircraft was fitted with larger tires to accommodate the increased weight and amenities for long flights such as increased padding in the seat, armrests, and a urinal. In addition, a full radio navigation suite was installed. Not surprisingly, combat performance with a full fuel load suffered. However, as the fuel load approached that of La-9, so did the performance. The aircraft was found to be poorly suited for combat above 7,000 m (23,000 ft). The new fighter, designated La-11 (OKB designation La-140) entered production in 1947. By the end of production in 1951, a total of 1,182 aircraft were built.

Operational history
The first documented combat use of La-11 took place on April 8, 1950, when four Soviet pilots shot down a United States Navy Consolidated PB4Y-2 Privateer over the Baltic Sea, with all 10 of the Privateer's crew lost. Later the same year, two La-11 pilots shot down a USN Lockheed P2V Neptune over the Sea of Japan near Vladivostok; one USN crew member was killed. 
 
From February 1950, the Soviet 106th Fighter Aviation Division moved to Shanghai to defend it against bombing by the ROCAF. The division included the 351st Fighter Regiment, equipped with the La-11. On March 7, the regiment claimed a North American B-25 Mitchell bomber, shot down near Nanjing. On March 14, 1950, a Martin B-26 Marauder bomber was claimed in Xuzhou. On March 20, 1950, five La-11 pilots encountered a group of North American P-51 Mustangs north-west of Shanghai, although the P-51 pilots immediately retreated. On April 2, 1950, two P-51s were claimed by La-11 pilots over Shanghai. After that, MiG-15s of the Soviet 29th Fighter Regiment took over the air defence role. The ROCAF stopped bombing Shanghai that June and the Soviet units left in October 1950.

By July 1950, La-11s were flying combat air patrol missions over North Korea.

On November 30, 1951, 16 La-11 fighter pilots of the 4th Fighter Aviation Regiment, Chinese People's Volunteer Army (PVA) were escorting 9 Tu-2 PVA bombers to bomb the South Korean island of Taehwa-do (대화도/大和島), in the Pansong archipelago.  They were attacked by more than 30 F-86 fighters of the United States Air Force: four Tu-2 bombers and three La-11s were shot down.

The main target of La-11 pilots during the Korean War was the Douglas A-26 Invader night bomber, although numerous skirmishes with P-51s also took place. Attempts to intercept Boeing B-29 Superfortress bombers proved fruitless. An La-11 required 26 minutes to reach the B-29's cruising altitude, and, once there, had a speed advantage of only 20 km/h (12 mph).

On July 23, 1954, a Douglas C-54 Skymaster military transport aircraft, registration VR-HEU, operated by Cathay Pacific Airways on a civilian passenger flight en route from Bangkok to Hong Kong, was shot down by two La-11 fighters  of the 85th Fighter Regiment, People's Liberation Army Air Force (PLAAF) off the coast of Hainan Island, killing 10 people in an incident that has become known as the 1954 Cathay Pacific Douglas DC-4 shootdown.

Although the four-engined propeller-driven Douglas (registered VR-HEU) was a C-54 Skymaster, the incident is known as "the DC-4 shootdown" because the C-54 is the military version of the Douglas DC-4, and the aircraft was flying a commercial passenger run.

Three days later, near the same location, two La-11s of the same unit were shot down by 2 AD-4 airplanes of the US Navy.

During 1954–55, La-11 fighters of the PLAAF took part in the Battle of Yijiangshan Islands escorting the ships of the People's Liberation Army Navy and Tu-2 bombers.

Operators

 
 Soviet Air Force
 Soviet Anti-Air Defence
 
 People's Liberation Army Air Force - Imported 163 La-11 fighters from 1950-1953. The last 18 La-11 airplanes retired in 1966.
 
 North Korean Air Force
 
 Indonesian Air Force

Surviving aircraft

China
La-11, on display at Chinese Aviation Museum, Datangshang, China as Red 24
La-11, on display at Beijing Air and Space Museum, Beijing, China as Red 09

Indonesia
La-11 F-911, on display at Indonesian Air Force Museum, Adisutjipto AB, Yogyakarta

Russia
La-11, on display at Nizhny Novgorod Military Museum, Russia

United Kingdom
La-11 20, stored pending restoration by The Fighter Collection, Duxford, Cambs

United States
La-11 10142/N2276Y, stored pending restoration with Kermit Weeks, Orlampa, Florida

Specifications (La-11)

See also

References
Notes

Bibliography

 Gordon, Yefim. Lavochkin's Piston-Engined Fighters (Red Star Volume 10). Earl Shilton, Leicester, UK: Midland Publishing Ltd., 2003. .
 Kopenhagen, W (ed.), Das große Flugzeug-Typenbuch (in German). Transpress, 1987,

External links

 Walkaround La-11 Fang
 https://web.archive.org/web/20110605030336/http://www.aviation.ru/La/#11

La-011
Low-wing aircraft
1940s Soviet fighter aircraft
Single-engined tractor aircraft